The 2013–14 season of the 3. Liga (also known as the TIPOS 3. liga for sponsorship reasons) was the twenty-first season of the third-tier football league in Slovakia, since its establishment in 1993.

The league was composed of 32 teams divided into two groups of 16 teams each, whose teams will be divided geographically (Western and Eastern). Teams played only other teams in their own division.

TIPOS 3. liga Západ 
Changes from last season

Team changes

To TIPOS 3. liga Západ
Promoted from Majstrovstvá regiónu
 FK Rača
 FC Horses Šúrovce
 MFK Skalica

Relegated from 2. liga
 None

From TIPOS 3. liga Západ
Promoted to 2. liga
 Spartak Trnava juniori

Relegated to Majstrovstvá regiónu
 FC Nitra juniori

Not registered to 3. liga Západ
 LP Domino
 OTJ Moravany nad Váhom (follower FK Púchov bought their license)

Locations

League table

TIPOS 3. liga Východ 
Changes from last season

Team changes

To TIPOS 3. liga Východ
Promoted from Majstrovstvá regiónu
 MŠK Žilina B
 ŠK Milenium 2000 Bardejovská Nová Ves

Relegated from 2. liga
 MFK Dolný Kubín
 TJ Baník Ružiná

From 3. liga Východ
Promoted to 2. liga
 FK Pohronie

Relegated to Majstrovstvá regiónu
 FK Spišská Nová Ves
 FK LAFC Lučenec

Not registered to 3. liga Východ
 Dukla Banská Bystrica juniori

Locations

League table

References

External links
 Slovak FA official site 

3
Slovak
3. Liga (Slovakia) seasons